Edouard F. Henriques is a make-up artist. He has over 70 film and TV credits.

Oscars

All of these were in the category of for Best Makeup

73rd Academy Awards-Nominated for The Cell. Nomination shared with Michèle Burke. Lost to How the Grinch Stole Christmas.
76th Academy Awards-Nominated for Master and Commander: The Far Side of the World. Nomination shared with Yolanda Toussieng. Lost to The Lord of the Rings: The Return of the King.
83rd Academy Awards-Nominated for The Way Back. Nomination shared with Gregory Funk and Yolanda Toussieng. Lost to The Wolfman.

References

External links

Living people
Year of birth missing (living people)
Make-up artists
Place of birth missing (living people)